is a Paralympic athlete from Japan competing mainly in category T36 sprints events.

Yuki competed in the 100m and 200m in the 2004, 2008 and 2012 Summer Paralympics winning the bronze medal in the T36 100m in 2004.

References

External links 
 

Year of birth missing (living people)
Living people
Japanese female sprinters
Paralympic athletes of Japan
Paralympic bronze medalists for Japan
Athletes (track and field) at the 2004 Summer Paralympics
Athletes (track and field) at the 2008 Summer Paralympics
Athletes (track and field) at the 2012 Summer Paralympics
Medalists at the 2004 Summer Paralympics
Paralympic medalists in athletics (track and field)
21st-century Japanese women